Rohit Mahendra Kanaiya (born 22 February 1973) is an Indian-born former Danish cricketer. Kanaiya was a right-handed batting who bowled right-arm medium pace. He was born at Chennai, Tamil Nadu.

Having moved to Denmark in 2001, Kanaiya made his debut for Denmark in the 2006 European Championship Division One, making two appearances against Ireland and the Netherlands. In 2009, he selected in Denmark's fifteen man squad for the World Cup Qualifier in South Africa. The matches in this tournament held List A status, with Kanaiya making two appearances against the Netherlands and Oman. Against the Netherlands, he was dismissed by Ryan ten Doeschate for 7 runs, Against Oman, he was dismissed by Tariq Hussain for a duck. Denmark finished the tournament in twelfth and last place, therefore failing to qualify for the 2011 World Cup. These matches were his final appearances for Denmark.

His father, Jayantilal Mahendra, played first-class cricket in India for Kerala.

References

External links
Rohit Kanaiya at ESPNcricinfo
Rohit Kanaiya at CricketArchive

1973 births
Living people
Cricketers from Chennai
Indian emigrants to Denmark
Danish cricketers